South Coast railway line may refer to:

Gold Coast railway line - railway line in Australia between Brisbane and the Gold Coast
South Coast Line - train service in Australia operated by NSW TrainLink between Sydney and Nowra
South Coast railway line, New South Wales - railway line in Australia between Sydney and Nowra
South Coast railway line, Queensland - closed railway line in Australia operated by Queensland Railways on the Gold Coast until 1964